Aime-la-Plagne is a commune in the Savoie department of southeastern France. The municipality was established on 1 January 2016 and consists of the former communes of Aime, Granier and Montgirod.

See also 
Communes of the Savoie department

References 

Communes of Savoie
Ceutrones